John Trevanion  (1613–1643) was an English politician.

John Trevanion may also refer to:
John Trevanion (merchant), English merchant and mayor, briefly MP for Dartmouth in 1529
John Trevanion (died 1810), MP for Dover 1774-1806

See also
John Bettesworth-Trevanion (1780–1840), Cornish politician